The 1961 FIBA European Championship, commonly called FIBA EuroBasket 1961, was the twelfth FIBA EuroBasket regional basketball championship, held by FIBA Europe. Nineteen national teams affiliated with the International Basketball Federation (FIBA) entered the competition. The tournament was hosted by Yugoslavia, and was held at the Belgrade City Fair.

First round

Group A

Group B

Group C

Group D

Group E

Group F

Second round

Group 1

Group 2

Classification round

Group 1

Group 2

13th-16th place classification playoffs

17th-19th place classification playoffs

Final round

Medals round

5th-8th place playoffs

9th-12th place playoffs

Final standings

Team rosters
1. Soviet Union: Jānis Krūmiņš, Gennadi Volnov, Valdis Muižnieks, Maigonis Valdmanis, Viktor Zubkov, Armenak Alachachian, Yuri Korneev, Vladimir Ugrekhelidze, Aleksander Petrov, Aleksander Kandel, Viacheslav Novikov, Albert Valtin (Coach: Stepan Spandaryan)

2. Yugoslavia: Radivoj Korać, Ivo Daneu, Slobodan Gordić, Radovan Radović, Nemanja Đurić, Vital Eiselt, Sreten Dragojlović, Marjan Kandus, Miha Lokar, Miodrag Nikolić, Zvonko Petričević, Željko Troskot (Coach: Aleksandar Nikolić)

3. Bulgaria: Viktor Radev, Mincho Dimov, Ljubomir Panov, Georgi Panov, Atanas Atanasov, Ilija Mirchev, Petko Lazarov, Tsvetko Savov, Khristo Tsvetkov, Khristo Donev, Radko Zlatev, Stefan Stojkov (Coach: Veselin Temkov)

4. France: Jean-Paul Beugnot, Henri Grange, Christian Baltzer, Bernard Mayeur, Michel Rat, Lucien Sedat, Jerome Christ, Michel House, Michel le Ray, Andre Goisbault, Jean-Claude Vergne, Andre Souvre (Coach: André Buffière)

References

External links
EuroBasket 1961 archive.fiba.com

1961
1960–61 in European basketball
1961 in Yugoslav basketball
International basketball competitions hosted by Yugoslavia
International sports competitions in Belgrade
1960s in Belgrade
April 1961 sports events in Europe
May 1961 sports events in Europe
1961 in Serbia
Basketball in Belgrade